The Battle of Wiesloch occurred on 3 December 1799,  during the War of the Second Coalition, part of the French Revolutionary Wars.   Lieutenant Field Marshal Anton Count Sztáray de Nagy-Mihaly commanded the far right wing protecting the main Austrian army in Swabia, under the command of Archduke Charles, Duke of Teschen. With the victory at Wiesloch (on 3 December), Sztáray's force drove the French from the right bank of the Rhine and relieved the fortress at Philippsburg.

References

External links
Wiesloch, Clash of Steel online battle database

Battles of the French Revolutionary Wars
Battles involving France
Battles involving Austria
Battles of the War of the Second Coalition
Conflicts in 1799
1799 in the Holy Roman Empire